Weston Burt (born in Fort Payne, Alabama) is an American country music singer. Burt is the flagship artist for HitShop Records, a record label distributed by Warner Music Nashville.

Career
Burt's debut single, "Lucky Sometimes," was released in March 2013. Billy Dukes of Taste of Country gave the song four stars out of five, writing that "it's performed with the confidence and conviction from someone who expects to be around for awhile." It charted for ten weeks on the Billboard Country Airplay chart, peaking at number 55 in July 2013. The song's music video premiered on CMT in June 2013. The song was included on an extended play, also titled Lucky Sometimes, which was released in June 2013. A second single, "Smile That Smile," was released in October 2013.

Discography

Extended plays

Singles

Music videos

References

External links

People from Fort Payne, Alabama
American country singer-songwriters
American male singer-songwriters
Country musicians from Alabama
Living people
Year of birth missing (living people)
Singer-songwriters from Alabama